Iris Kensmil (born 1970, Amsterdam) is a Dutch artist of Surinamese descent. In 1996 she obtained her degree from the Academie Minerva in Groningen. In 2017 Kensmil participated in the exhibition Zwart en Revolutionair (Black and Revolutionary) at the Black Archives in Amsterdam. Her work was included in the 2019 Venice Biennale.

References

1970 births
Living people
20th-century Dutch women artists
21st-century Dutch women artists
Artists from Amsterdam
Dutch contemporary artists